The Battle of the Malalag River was fought between the Philippines and the United States during the Philippine–American War which resulted in the death of Datu Ali, who had eluded the Americans longer than any other Moro leader.

Background
Datu Ali was the cousin of Datu Uto, ruler of Mindanao in the 1880s, and the son-in-law of Datu Piang.  Ali controlled the export of rice, beeswax, coffee, and products extracted from Almaciga and Gutta-percha trees.  Ali held a grudge against the Americans when they refused to let him travel to the US.  Ali retreated deep into the Cotabato Valley.

Engagement
General James Buchanan's force started to march inland as a decoy from the west, while the main American effort under McCoy moved inland from the east.  McCoy, and Lt. Johnston, led 100 men from the 22nd Infantry, 10 Philippine Scouts, and 140 Filipino bearers.  Buchanan departed on October 13, 1905, while McCoy reached the Malala River on October 22, having left behind his scouts, bearers and 13 soldiers on the way from Digos.

Surrounding Ali's residence beside Malala River, McCoy's men overpowered four guards, each armed with a Bolo knife.  Ali fired a Mauser rifle which killed an American private, but Lt. Philip Remington's pistol shot wounded Ali, who fled inside his house and out the rear where an American squad put fifteen more shots into Ali, killing him.

Aftermath
The merchants of Zamboanga City gave a public celebration, and McCoy received praise from Leonard Wood and President Theodore Roosevelt.

References

Conflicts in 1902
1902 in the Philippines
Battles involving the United States
Battles of the Philippine–American War
Naval battles of the Philippine–American War
Naval battles involving the Philippines
History of Davao del Sur
October 1905 events